Michael Lin (born June 8, 1942) is an Israeli mathematician, who has published  scientific articles in the field of probability concentrating on Markov chains and ergodic theory. He serves as professor emeritus at the Department of Mathematics in Ben-Gurion University of the Negev (BGU). Additionally, he is a member of the academic board and serves as the academic coordinator at Achva Academic College. Professor Lin is considered a Zionist, as he gave up a position at Ohio State University in order to promote the field of mathematics in Israel.

Biography
Michael Lin was born in Israel. He holds a Bachelor of Science in Mathematics and Physics from The Hebrew University of Jerusalem (1963), Master of Science in Mathematics (1967) and a PhD in Mathematics also from The Hebrew University of Jerusalem (1971). In 1971 he was appointed as an assistant professor in Ohio State University. In 1976 he returned to Israel and became a senior lecturer in the Department of Mathematics at Ben-Gurion University of the Negev. Only 4 years later, at 1979, he became an associate professor and in 1984 he became a full professor. In 2011, Professor Lin retired and nowadays he serves as professor emeritus. During his career at Ben-Gurion University of the Negev he acted as:
 Computer Science Coordinator, Department of Mathematics and Computer Science, BGU.
 Member of BGU Computer Policy committee.
 Chairman and Computer Science Coordinator, Department of Mathematics and Computer Science, BGU.
 Senate representative to Executive Committee of Board of Trustees of BGU.
 Senate representative to the BGU Executive Committee's subcommittee for student affairs.
 President, Israel Mathematical Union.
 Head of the Ethical Code Committee of BGU.
In 2004 Professor Lin also acted as a member of the committee electing the recipients of the Israel Prize in mathematics.

In addition to his academic activities, Professor Lin made a social-academic contribution, as he took a part in the 'Kamea Program'. The program helped immigrant scientists to continue working in their profession in the academy in Israel. Professor Lin assisted in the absorption of these immigrants in Ben-Gurion University of the Negev, specifically in the Department of Mathematics. Until his retirement, he was listed as an absorbing researcher of two scientists in his department. He was also responsible for the immigrants’ employment terms and insisted that they will be members of the Academic Staff Union. Additionally, Professor Lin was the university representative in a discussion regarding this program in the Israeli Parliament (knesset) and acted as an advisor regarding the newcomers’ academic  seniority.

Research and Publications
Professor Lin's published work focuses on two main areas of research in the field of probability: Ergodic theory and Markov chain. More specifically, he researched in several areas: mean and individual Ergodic theory, Central limit theorem and functional analysis.
Professor Lin has received various grants including: Israel Science Foundation (1995–1998) grant, Research Support Fund grant (2001–2002), Milken Families Foundation Chair in Mathematics grant (1989 until retirement). Among others, these grants supported his scientific research which has already yielded 85 scientific publications.

References 

1942 births
Living people
Israeli mathematicians
Einstein Institute of Mathematics alumni